Cyperus subcastaneus is a species of sedge that occurs in Brazil, where is found from Bahia to Minas Gerais.

The species was first formally described by the botanist David Alan Simpson in 1987.

See also
 List of Cyperus species

References

subcastaneus
Plants described in 1987
Flora of Brazil